Dené–Yeniseian is a proposed language family consisting of the Yeniseian languages of central Siberia and the Na-Dené languages of northwestern North America.

Reception among experts has been somewhat favorable; thus, Dené–Yeniseian has been called "the first demonstration of a genealogical link between Old World and New World language families that meets the standards of traditional comparative-historical linguistics", besides the Eskimo–Aleut languages spoken in far eastern Siberia and North America.

Early work

Amateur and professional researchers in historical linguistics have long sought to link the various known language families around the world into macrofamilies. The putative relationship between Na-Dené and Yeniseian families was first proposed by Alfredo Trombetti in 1923. Much of the early evidence adduced has been typological; in particular, both families have a complex agglutinative prefixing verb structure, which differs from most of the other languages in Asia and—to a lesser extent—North America.

The first peer-reviewed publication to propose the existence of a distinct Dené–Yeniseian family was written by the macrofamily supporter Merritt Ruhlen (1998) in Proceedings of the National Academy of Sciences, United States. However,  states, without specifying which ones, that 26 of the 34 sets of words offered by Ruhlen are coincidental look-alikes, whereas 8 of Ruhlen's word sets follow Vajda's rules of sound correspondences. 

Michael Fortescue independently suggested the possible existence of a Dené–Yeniseian family in his 1998 book Language Relations Across Bering Strait (see pages 213–215). He writes, "I have attempted throughout to find a middle way between the cavalier optimism of 'lumpers' and the pessimism of orthodox 'splitters' on the matters of deep genetic relationship between the continents".

As alluded to by Fortescue's comment, scientific investigations of long-range language family relationships have been complicated by an ideological dispute between the so-called "lumpers" and "splitters", with "lumpers" caricatured as bumbling amateurs willing to group together disparate, unrelated families based on chance resemblances and the "splitters" caricatured as rigid enforcers of orthodoxy willing to "shout down" researchers who disagree with their belief that long-range connections are impossible to establish.

Vajda's proposal
At a symposium in Alaska in 2008, Edward Vajda of Western Washington University summarized ten years of research, based on verbal morphology and reconstructions of the proto-languages, indicating that the Yeniseian and Na-Dené families might be related. The summation of Vajda's research was published in June 2010 in The Dene–Yeniseian Connection in the Anthropological Papers of the University of Alaska. 

This 369-page volume, edited by James Kari and Ben Potter, contains papers from the February 26–29, 2008, symposium plus several contributed papers. Accompanying Vajda's lead paper are primary data on Na-Dene historical phonology by Jeff Leer, along with critiques by several linguistic specialists and articles on a range of topics (archaeology, prehistory, ethnogeography, genetics, kinship, and folklore) by experts in these fields.

The evidence offered by Vajda includes over 110 proposed cognate morphemes and about ten homologous prefix and suffix positions of the verbs. Vajda compared the existing reconstructions of Proto-Yeniseian and Proto-Na-Dené, augmented the reconstructions based on the apparent relationship between the two, and suggested sound changes linking the two into a putative Proto-Dené-Yeniseian language. He suggested that Yeniseian tone differences originated in the presence or absence of glottalized consonants in the syllable coda, as still present in the Na-Dené languages.

Vajda and others also note that no compelling evidence has been found linking Haida with either Na-Dené or Yeniseian. As for the wider Dené–Caucasian hypothesis (see above), while Vajda did not find the kinds of morphological correspondences with these other families that he did with Yeniseian and Na-Dené, he did not rule out the possibility that such evidence exists, and urges that more work be done.

In 2011 Vajda published a short annotated bibliography on Dené–Yeniseian languages. On March 24, 2012, the Alaska Native Language Center hosted the Dené-Yeniseian Workshop at the University of Alaska Fairbanks. There were nine papers, the first new papers on Dené–Yeniseian since the 2010 volume was published. As of July 2012, there are no plans to publish the papers, but video from the workshop is available.

Vajda's presentations at the 2012 workshop augmented his proposal with additional linguistic and non-linguistic evidence. He discussed a study he did with Johanna Nichols investigating the history of complex prefixing verb structures in various families possessing morphology of this sort. His conclusion was that, contrary to prevailing belief, such structures are often preserved intact with little change over several thousands of years, and as a result may actually be stronger evidence of a genetic connection than the lexical relationships that are traditionally sought. 

As a result, he agreed with the consensus belief that lexical evidence of a genetic relationship becomes virtually undetectable after about 8,000 to 10,000 years of linguistic separation, but suggested that certain sorts of complex morphology may remain stable beyond this time period.

Vajda presents comparanda for an ancient Dene-Yeniseian possessive connector prefix (possibly *ŋ) that appears in idiosyncratic ways in Dene (or Athabaskan), Eyak, Tlingit, and Yeniseian nouns, postpositions, directionals, and demonstratives. Vajda also suggests one new lexical cognate: PA directional *ñəs-d "ahead", "out on open water" and Yeniseian root *es "open space". In terms of the sections within Vajda's 2010 paper, this 2013 article can be read as an addition to his §2 (which ends on p. 63). In a subsequent article, Vajda discusses features in Ket that arose due to prolonged areal contact with suffixal agglutinating languages.

In his 2012 presentation, Vajda also addressed non-linguistic evidence, including analyses of Y-chromosome and mitochondrial DNA haplogroups, which are passed unchanged down the male and female lines, respectively, except for mutations. His most compelling DNA evidence is the Q1 Y-chromosomal haplogroup subclade, which he notes arose c. 15,000 years ago and is found in nearly all Native Americans and nearly all of the Yeniseian Ket people (90%), but almost nowhere else in Eurasia except for the Selkup people (65%), who have intermarried with the Ket people for centuries. 

Using this and other evidence, he proposes a Proto-Dené-Yeniseian homeland located in eastern Siberia around the Amur and Aldan Rivers. These people would have been hunter-gatherers, as are the modern Yeniseians, but unlike nearly all other Siberian groups (except for some Paleosiberian peoples located around the Pacific Rim of far eastern Siberia, who appear genetically unrelated to the Yeniseians). 

Eventually all descendants in Eurasia were eliminated by the spread of reindeer-breeding pastoralist peoples (e.g. the speakers of the so-called Altaic languages) except for the modern Yeniseians, who were able to survive in swampy refuges far to the west along the Yenisei River because it is too mosquito-infested for reindeer to survive easily. Contrarily, the caribou (the North American reindeer population) were never domesticated, and thus the modern Na-Dené people were not similarly threatened.

In his 2012 reply to George Starostin, Vajda clarifies that Dené-Yeniseian "as it currently stands is a hypothesis of language relatedness but not yet a proper hypothesis of language taxonomy". He leaves "open the possibility that either Yeniseian or ND (or both) might have a closer relative elsewhere in Eurasia".

Reception
At the time of publication Vajda's proposals had been favorably reviewed by several specialists of Na-Dené and Yeniseian languages—although at times with caution—including Michael Krauss, Jeff Leer, James Kari, and Heinrich Werner, as well as a number of other respected linguists, such as Bernard Comrie, Johanna Nichols, Victor Golla, Michael Fortescue, Eric Hamp, and Bill Poser. 

One significant exception is the critical review of the volume of collected papers by Lyle Campbell and a response by Vajda published in late 2011 that imply that the proposal is not settled at the present time. Other reviews and notices of the volume appeared in 2011 and 2012 by Keren Rice, Jared Diamond, and Michael Dunn. Sicoli and Holton 2014, applying Bayesian analysis to typological data from Dene and Yeniseian languages, constructed phylogenies that suggest that the Dene-Yeniseian connection "more likely represents a radiation out of Beringia with a back migration into Central Asia than a migration from Central Asia or Western Asia to North America".

In 2012, linguist George Starostin questioned the validity of the macrofamily, citing the fact that "Vajda’s 'regular correspondences' are not... properly 'regular' in the classic comparative-historical sense of the word". He also notes that Vajda's "treatment of the verbal morphology" involves "a tiny handful of intriguing isomorphisms... surrounded by an impenetrable sea of assumptions and highly controversial internal reconstructions that create an illusion of systemic reconstruction where there really is none". Nonetheless, Starostin concedes that Vajda's work "is, by all means, a step forward", and that it "may eventually point the way towards research on grammaticalization paths in Yeniseian and Na-Dené".

Instead of forming a separate family, Starostin believes that both Yeniseian and Na-Dené are part of a much larger grouping called Dene-Caucasian. So Starostin states that the two families are related in a large sense, but there is no special relationship between them that would suffice to create a separate family between these two language families.

In 2015, linguist Paul Kiparsky endorsed Dené–Yeniseian, saying that "the morphological parallelism and phonological similarities among corresponding affixes is most suggestive, but most compelling evidence for actual relationship comes from those sound correspondences which can be accounted for by independently motivated regular sound changes".

Classification
Dené–Yeniseian is generally classified as follows.

Using computational phylogenetic methods, Sicoli & Holton (2014) proposed that Dené–Yeniseian did not split into the two primary branches Na-Dené and Yeniseian, but rather into several branches. Yeniseian is upheld as a single branch, whereas Na-Dené is assumed to be paraphyletic, being divided into several primary branches instead. Based on this novel classification, they suggest that Yeniseian represents a back-migration from Beringia back to Asia. However, this phylogenetic study was criticized as methodologically flawed by Yanovich (2020), since it did not employ sufficient input data to generate a robust tree that does not depend on the initial choice of the "tree prior", i.e. the model for the tree generation. The classification of Sicoli & Holton (2014) lists divides the family into four primary branches.

Dené-Yeniseian
Yeniseian
Tlingit, Eyak
South Pacific Coast Athabaskan (California)
Athabaskan (excluding South Pacific Coast Athabaskan)

Ket and Navajo word pairs
Below is a table of Ket and Navajo words.

Notes: Navajo inalienable nouns are attached with the prefix a-, which means "someone's".

See also

Settlement of the Americas
Genetic history of indigenous peoples of the Americas#Haplogroup Q
Karasuk languages
Uralo-Siberian

References

Bibliography
Primary Dené–Yeniseian research papers by Edward Vajda
 

Vajda, Edward J. (2017). "Patterns of Innovation and Retention in Templatic Polysynthesis." In Oxford Handbook of Polysynthesis, M. Fortescue, M. Mithun, and N. Evans (eds.), pp. 363–391. Oxford University Press, Oxford.
Vajda, Edward (2019). "Morphology in Dene-Yeniseian Languages". In Oxford Research Encyclopedia of Linguistics. Retrieved 7 December 2021.

Reviews, related work, etc.
Aronoff, Mark. (2015) "Thoughts on Morphology and Cultural Evolution." L. Bauer et al. (eds.). Semantics of Complex Words, Studies in Morphology 3 pp. 77-88. Springer International Publishing Switzerland. 

 
 
 

 
 Vajda, Edward. 2013. Assessing the Sino-Caucasian Hypothesis. Comparative-Historical Linguistics of the XXIst Century: Issues and Perspectives. Institute for Oriental and Classical Studies, Russian State University for the Humanities. Moscow, March 20-22, 2013.

External links

 Ordering information and news items for The Dene–Yeniseian Connection; the 2011 2nd printing has corriagenda for 14 articles in the 2010 ist printing
 March 24, 2012 Dene-Yeniseian Workshop, University of Alaska Fairbanks, sponsored by ANLC; lecture by Ed Vajda and other papers now available via ANLC and YouTube.''
 "New language research supports land bridge evidence" Anchorage Daily News
 Dené–Yeniseian Swadesh lists (incomplete)
 Linguistic Phylogenies Support Back-Migration from Beringia to Asia – Presents evidence that the ancestors of the Yeniseian-speaking people went west from the Bering land bridge, whereas the ancestors of Na-Dené went east.
 "Linguist's 'big data' research supports waves of migration into the Americas" Phys.org – Follow up study to the link above.

 
Proposed language families